Every Step You Take (literally "Walking With You") is an 2015 Hong Kong modern romance television drama created and produced by TVB, starring Moses Chan and Myolie Wu as the main cast. Filming took place from March 2014 to June 2014. The drama is broadcast on Hong Kong's Jade and HD Jade channels from August 31 till September 25, 2015 airing every Monday through Friday during its 8:30-9:30 pm timeslot with a total of 20 episodes.

Synopsis
Due to an unfortunate accident, magazine photographer Sung Tin Chung (Myolie Wu) lost her ability to see. Despite her love for beauty and watching television dramas, Tin Chung was not deterred by her blindness. With the help of her boyfriend, To Ching Hang (Jonathan Cheung), and her guide dog, Tin Chung maintains her optimism and finds strength from her new motto, ‘Love Conquers All’.

While Tin Chung is slowly putting her life back together, her new neighbor and advertising guru Kam Yin Chong (Moses Chan) is suffering from a midlife crisis. A former workaholic, Yin Chong lost contact with all his friends and family. Unable to handle his behavior, even his mentee Yeun Yuen (Elaine Yiu) quits. Lost, and unable to cope with the loneliness, Yin Chong decides to take a long vacation to find his way again.

After breaking up with her boyfriend, Tin Chung crosses paths with Yin Chong and finds comfort in her lonely neighbor. Although their personalities differ vastly from the beginning, Tin Chung and Yin Chong slowly fall in love with each other and realize that they are not so different after all.

Cast

Kam family
Suet Nei as Leung Giu (梁嬌)
Moses Chan as Kam Yin Chong (甘言重)(homophone to So Serious、 Korean actor Kim Hyun Joong)
Helen Ma as Szeto Fei Fei (司徒菲菲)

Yue family
Evergreen Mak as Yue Kar Ging (余加勁)
Meini Cheung as Yue Kar Kan (余加勤)
Yeung Ka Shing as Yue Shing Lok (余承樂)

3L Advertising Company
Elaine Yiu as Yuen Yuen (阮婉)
Rachel Kan as Lam Wing (林詠)
Brian Chu as Bernard
Akai Lee as Calvin
Tsang Man as Don
Snow Suen as Emma Lo Wai Ping (勞慧萍)
Ho Wai Yip as Anchor
Sandy Wu
Ip Ting Chi
Wan Sze Pui
Kedar Wong
Ng Sin Tung

Dream Power Workshop
Anderson Junior as Pak Tung Tung (白東東)
Owen Cheung as Kam Sau Yuen (金秀玄)(original name as Kam Tung Chan (金東燦); homophone for role name to Korean Star Kim Soo Hyun、original name to Korean football player Kim Dong-chan、designed name as Leo Ku、 Fred Cheng、Eason Chan)
Owen Ng as Chiu Ting Chun (趙廷晉)
Mandy Lam as Ha Yat Lin (夏一蓮)
Christy Chan as Hui Sum Yu (許芯悅)
Calvin Chan as Jason
Cilla Kung as Ho Na (何娜)(homophone to Korean actress Kim Ha Neul、designed name as Leo Ku's wife Lorraine、Denise Ho)
Man Yeung as Chung (聰)
Myolie Wu as Sung Tin Chung (宋天從)
Mikako Leung as Wan Wan Wan (溫韻雲)

Extended Cast
Jonathan Cheung as To Ching Hang (杜正恆)
Jess Sum as Angela
William Chak as Lam Chung Wai (林宗偉)
Lily Ho as Sally (莎利)
Chow Chung as Chong Jing (莊正)
Joe Junior
Tracy Ip as Bianca
Kanice Lau as Ng Sin Lin (吳倩蓮)
Aurora Li
Agnes Lam

Special Guest
Raymond Wong Ho-yin as himself
Priscilla Wong as herself
Tony Hung as Hung Man Ho (洪民浩) (homophone to Korean actor Lee Min Ho)

Development
The costume fitting ceremony was held on March 14, 2014 at 12:30 pm Tseung Kwan O TVB City Studio One.
The blessing ceremony took place on April 25, 2014 at 3:00 pm Tseung Kwan O TVB City Studio Thirteen.
Vincent Wong was originally cast in the role, To Chik Hang, but dropped out due to a schedule conflict and was replaced by Jonathan Cheung.

Viewership ratings

International broadcast

Awards and nominations

References

TVB dramas
2015 Hong Kong television series debuts
2015 Hong Kong television series endings